Vita is a brand name of various types of beverage and food produced by Hong Kong-based beverage company Vitasoy. First introduced in 1976 as a series of different flavored fruit drinks the brand later expanded to include the world's first ready-to-drink lemon tea beverage. Vita-brand beverage are now available not only in Hong Kong, but also in different countries.

Different beverages such as fruit juice, tea, milk and water are given the Vita brand while high-protein soy milk drink are given the Vitasoy brand.

Variants

Vita-brand

Vitasoy-brand 

 Vitasoy series – original soy milk drinks
 Calci-Plus series – calcium enriched plant milk
 Pure series – "pure taste" drinks
 Sansui series – non-GMO organic soybean soy milk and tofu

References

External links
VitaVitasoy (in Chinese)
Vita USA

Hong Kong brands
Hong Kong drinks